The Dr. B. R. Ambedkar Smriti Vanam or the Dr. B. R. Ambedkar Memorial Park is a monument under-construction dedicated to B. R. Ambedkar, the 20th century Indian polymath, champion of human rights and the father of the Indian Constitution. The memorial will be located at Inavolu village in Thullur mandal, Amaravati in the Indian state of Andhra Pradesh. The height of the statue of Ambedkar will be . the chief minister of Andhra Pradesh on Ambedkar Jayanti, 14 April 2017.

History
The Government of Andhra Pradesh  decided that on the occasion of 125th birth anniversary of Ambedkar i.e. 14 April 2016, an Ambedkar Memorial would be set up which would be 125 feet high. In April 2016, Telangana's Chief Minister, K. Chandrasekhar Rao, has also decided to install a 125-feet tall statue of Ambedkar in Hyderabad city. The foundation stone of the memorial was laid by N. Chandrababu Naidu, the Chief Minister of Andhra Pradesh on the 126th birth anniversary of Ambedkar in 2017.

Specifications 
The project area is planned to be spread over a  site. The memorial will cost ₹97.64 crores. This includes ₹25 crore for the 125-ft bronze statue of Ambedkar. The Memorial park will have a multi-purpose Convention Hall with a seating capacity of 3,000 persons. Dr. B. R. Ambedkar Memorial Library with his collected works and thoughts, a Buddhist Meditation Hall, Memorial Park with aesthetic and landscaped gardens and an open-air theatre with a seating capacity of 2,000 people with facilities for conducting multi-media shows are some of the other features of the memorial park. A reading room or library will be set up with 10,000 books in this memorial, which will be useful for those wishing to study and research on Ambedkar's ideas and principles. There will also be a theater, where the exhibits on Ambedkar will be displayed.

See also
 List of statues of B. R. Ambedkar
 List of things named after B. R. Ambedkar
 List of tallest statues
 Ambedkar Memorial Park
 Dr. Ambedkar National Memorial
 Statue of Equality

References

Proposed statues in India
Memorials to B. R. Ambedkar
Statues of B. R. Ambedkar
Monuments and memorials in Andhra Pradesh
Buildings and structures in Andhra Pradesh
Colossal statues in India
Museums in Andhra Pradesh
Buddhist sites in Andhra Pradesh
Buddhist buildings in India
Amaravati
Dalit culture
Religious buildings and structures in Andhra Pradesh
Dalit monuments
Tourism in Andhra Pradesh